The following is a list of 1988 Seattle Mariners draft picks. The Mariners took part in the June regular draft, also known as the Rule 4 draft. The Mariners made 52 selections in the 1988 draft, the first being first baseman Tino Martinez in the first round. In all, the Mariners selected 22 pitchers, 10 outfielders, 8 catchers, 3 shortstops, 3 third basemen, 2 first basemen, and 2 second basemen.

Draft

Key

Table

References
General references

Inline citations

External links
Seattle Mariners official website